Thomas Bleakley McDowell often called T. B. McDowell, or simply "the Major", (18 May 1923 – 9 September 2009) was a British Army officer and subsequently chief executive of The Irish Times for nearly 40 years.

Early life
Born in Belfast in 1923, the only child of a Protestant and unionist couple, McDowell finished school at the Royal Belfast Academic Institution in 1941 as the second World War was under way. He was dissuaded from enlisting immediately in the British army by his parents: his father, also Thomas, had been gassed in the first World War and suffered serious lung problems which led to his early death in 1944. The young Tom went instead to Queen's University in Belfast to study commerce but, a year later and still uncertain about his long-term plans, he joined the Royal Inniskilling Fusiliers, being commissioned in 1943. He went on to join the Royal Ulster Rifles.

A knee injury during a night training exercise in Omagh made him ineligible for active military service and he became a weapons instructor. The accident also led to him meeting his future wife, Margaret Telfer, the physiotherapist who treated him in hospital in Bangor, Co Down.

He rose to the rank of major and was part of the Allied forces in occupied Austria following the end of the war, taking part in joint patrols in Vienna with Russian, American and French officers. In the post-war period, he was given two years to finish his college course and spent a summer studying law with a tutor before passing the English bar and returning to the British army.

After a further military posting to Edinburgh, his legal qualification brought him to the army legal service in the War Office in London. With little prospect of further promotion and every chance of being posted abroad without his young family, he decided to leave the army. He was offered a job as legal adviser in London to James North Ltd, a company which made protective clothing; with no experience of industry, he asked to be given a managerial role at first.

The company suggested a managing position in its operations in Dublin. He slotted easily into the city's old business establishment, joining the Kildare Street club, becoming a director of Pim's department store, and setting his career firmly on a commercial rather than a legal path.

The Irish Times
His involvement with newspapers came about through the recognition of his business acumen. He was asked by some acquaintances to take a look at the financial troubles of the Evening Mail, which was bought subsequently by The Irish Times, adding to the latter's own financial difficulties.

He was asked later by The Irish Times to see if Roy Thomson, the Canadian-born British press baron whom he had met while they both looked separately at the Evening Mail, might be interested in taking it over. Thomson passed and the company then asked McDowell himself to take charge as chief executive in 1962.

Among his first actions were to close the Evening Mail and the Sunday Review, a short-lived tabloid that was ahead of its time. A year later, another problem was resolved when Douglas Gageby, who had been hired as managing director of The Irish Times shortly before McDowell's arrival, took over as editor.

Relationship with Douglas Gageby
Thus, what had begun as a slightly awkward relationship, turned into a highly successful partnership as Gageby set about broadening the newspaper's editorial appeal and McDowell set it on a successful commercial course.

McDowell always credited Gageby and his successors as editor with the success of the newspaper, pointing out in an interview last year for the newspaper's archives that "people buy the paper to see what the editor has said, not to know how it is printed or what kind of paper is used".

Although he had a close relationship with editors, especially Gageby, he did not interfere in the editorial running of the newspaper. He did not share Gageby's republicanism but believed that the minority in the North had been treated badly by the majority.

When the North erupted in violence in 1969 - a time when there was little or no real communication between nationalists and unionists or between Irish and British politicians and bureaucrats - he tried on his own initiative to interest the then British prime minister, Harold Wilson, in talks with all the other parties involved.

His efforts came to nothing but irritated the then British ambassador to Dublin, Sir Andrew Gilchrist, whom he had bypassed.

In a briefing letter about McDowell's approach, Gilchrist wrote that McDowell had described Gageby as "a renegade or white nigger". McDowell strongly denied the charge when Gilchrist's letter was published in 2003: "I never used that phrase, nor would I have thought of using it, about Gageby," he said in last year's interview. "Other people (in Belfast) called him a renegade, but I never thought he was a renegade. Douglas never made any secret of what he was. There could be no doubt about him turning or changing or anything like that."

The Irish Times Trust

By the early 1970s, the circulation of The Irish Times had almost doubled in a decade to 60,000 and it was making money. Some of the directors indicated an interest in selling the company and McDowell proposed instead that it be turned into a trust. It was a period when several newspapers in Ireland and Britain had changed hands or were seen as being vulnerable to takeovers.

His aims were to protect the newspaper's independence, make it as difficult as possible for anyone to take over, and formalise its aims in a guiding trust.

McDowell's primary interest in the arrangements was in drawing up the terms of the trust, using his legal expertise and drawing on a wide range of media models including the Guardian, the Observer, the Economist magazine, and the New York Times as well as other documents ranging from the Constitution to the American Declaration of Independence.

He worked on the trust document for many months, going through 28 drafts before he was satisfied with the result. Among the issues he had to consider was the mechanism for appointing trustees: various options which would allow public bodies or interests to name members were considered but ruled out because of fears that the appointments would become politicised.

In the end, he opted to appoint them himself, with the help of each one selected to appoint others. When he had finished the draft trust document he showed it to Gageby who suggested that a proviso requiring the newspaper to reflect minority views be included, which it was.

The five directors of the company, including McDowell and Gageby, transferred their shares in the company to a solicitor in the autumn of 1973 in anticipation of announcing the trust at the end of that year.

Further delays in finalising the trust terms resulted in its announcement in April 1974, on the eve of the introduction of capital gains tax.

The timing gave rise to suggestions that the directors were taking their cash (£325,000 each) out of the company before the new tax took effect.

McDowell always denied that this was the case, maintaining that the timing was coincidental: he was also adamant that the motivation behind the formation of the trust itself was altruistic. The formation of the trust left the newspaper with a large bank debt, used to buy out the directors/shareholders, at what turned out to be a difficult economic period after the first oil crisis hit the western world in the autumn of 1974. McDowell successfully guided The Irish Times' financial fortunes through the subsequent recession and into further periods of growth throughout the 1980s and 1990s.

He stood down as chief executive of the company in 1997 and retired from the chairmanship of The Irish Times Trust in 2001: he was given the title President for Life in recognition of his huge contribution to the newspaper.

Tom McDowell was a private person and never sought or exploited the public status or limelight that goes with being a newspaper publisher. But he was an extraordinary presence in "the bunker", his office in D'Olier Street. He always dressed formally and though he was somewhat aloof, he knew every employee.

During his visit to the new The Irish Times offices on Tara Street, in June 2008 for the unveiling of a portrait of him by Andrew Festing, he described the newspaper and his family as the two loves of his life.

Personal life

His wife, Margaret, predeceased him in 1992. At the time of his death he was survived by his daughters Penelope and Karen, sons-in-law, five grandchildren and four great grandchildren.

References

1923 births
2009 deaths
Businesspeople from Northern Ireland
Irish chief executives
The Irish Times people